The Sunday Times was a newspaper published in Sydney, New South Wales, Australia from 1885 to 1930.

History
The Sunday Times was founded by  W. H. Leighton Bailey. It was first published on 15 November 1885 by Charles Mark Curtiss, and ceased with no. 2389 on 1 June 1930.

The Sunday Times was controlled by the Evans family for over 30 years, until 1916 when the Sunday Times Newspaper Company, as well as the company's premises, were sold to Hugh D. McIntosh. In 1927, McIntosh sold his holdings in the Sunday Times Newspaper Company to Beckett's Newspapers, with J. H. C. Sleeman as Managing Director. The Sunday Times ceased publication in 1930, with staff informed on 8 June.

The Sunday Times Newspaper Company also published The Referee from 1887, and later the Arrow.

Digitisation
This paper has been digitised as part of the Australian Newspapers Digitisation Program project of the National Library of Australia.

See also
 List of newspapers in Australia
 List of newspapers in New South Wales

References

External links
 

Defunct newspapers published in Sydney
1885 establishments in Australia
1930 disestablishments in Australia
Publications established in 1885
Publications disestablished in 1930
Newspapers on Trove